Ola Dada is a Canadian stand-up comedian, most noted as a finalist in the 2019 SiriusXM Top Comic competition.

Born in Nigeria, Dada moved to Canada at the age of 10, and spent his teen years living in Fort McMurray, Alberta. He moved to Vancouver, British Columbia to study accounting, and worked in banks before pursuing stand-up comedy in local Vancouver comedy clubs.

In 2020, he was featured in the CBC Gem stand-up comedy web series The New Wave of Standup. In 2022 he was a competitor in the second season of Canada's Got Talent, making the semifinals, and released his debut comedy album Dada Plan.

References

External links

21st-century Canadian comedians
Canadian stand-up comedians
Canadian male comedians
Black Canadian comedians
Nigerian emigrants to Canada
People from Fort McMurray
Comedians from Alberta
Comedians from Vancouver
Canada's Got Talent contestants
Living people
Year of birth missing (living people)